Arcania: Fall of Setarrif is an action role-playing video game and the standalone expansion for Arcania: Gothic 4. It was released on 25 October 2011 after a long period of silence from both publishers and after being delayed indefinitely in March 2011.

It was announced by Spellbound Entertainment and JoWooD on 9 December 2010.

Plot 
Arcania: Fall of Setarrif ties up the loose ends of the main game's story and adds yet another chapter to the epic tale. After the demon that possessed King Rhobar III was exorcised, it made its way to Setarrif to find a new host. In Setarrif, which is cut off from the rest of the island, chaos and anarchy spread rapidly.

King Rhobar III is troubled by these facts and is afraid of losing the city and some of his companions, which are in Setarrif at that very moment. The nameless hero therefore is sent by the king and must journey to Setarrif but he has no idea of what lies before him.

Overview 
A new threat casts its shadow over the Southern Isles. A mysterious demon, consumed by hatred, terrifies the population and pools his force against the coastal city of Setarrif. The dramatic situation exacerbates after a volcanic eruption in the mountains nearby. Thereupon the nameless hero joins forces with his strongest allies and courageously faces the new menace.

Development 
The development of the addon started around mid 2010, although it was planned earlier in the development of Arcania: Gothic 4. With the current financial problems of the publisher, no other details have been revealed regarding the development of the game. JoWooD's community manager announced on one of the fansites that the debut trailer would be available in March 2011.

On 3 March 2011, JoWooD Entertainment released the official website and first trailer for the add-on.

On 22 March 2011, JoWooD Entertainment announced that the expansion has been delayed indefinitely because of legal issues with BVT Games Fund III.

However, on 21 September 2011, new publisher Nordic Games announced that the add-on would be available on 25 October 2011 for Microsoft Windows.

Notes

References 

2011 video games
Role-playing video games
Video game expansion packs
Video games developed in Germany
Video games using PhysX
Windows games
Xbox 360 games
PlayStation 3 games
PlayStation 4 games
Gothic (series)
THQ Nordic games
Spellbound Entertainment games
Single-player video games

pl:Arcania: Gothic 4#Kontynuacja